Susan Sullivan (born 1942) is an American actress.

Susan Sullivan may also so refer to:

 Susan Sullivan (Alaska politician) (born 1946)
 Susan Sullivan (Canadian politician)
 Sue Sullivan, fictional character in the soap opera Brookside